Jason Buxton is a Canadian film director and screenwriter. He wrote and directed three short films, A Fresh Start, The Garden and The Drawing, before debuting his first full-length feature film, Blackbird, in 2012.

Career 
Buxton's first feature film Blackbird was nominated for two awards at the 1st Canadian Screen Awards, including a nomination for Best Original Screenplay. It was also a co-winner, alongside Brandon Cronenberg's Antiviral, of the Best Canadian First Feature Film award at the 2012 Toronto International Film Festival. The film won three awards at that year's Atlantic Film Festival: Best Atlantic Feature, Best Atlantic Director, and the Michael Weir Award for Outstanding Atlantic Screenplay (sponsored by the Michael Weir Foundation for the Arts).

Blackbird also won the 2013 Claude Jutra Award for the year's best Canadian film by a first-time director.

Personal life 
Buxton is based in Chester, Nova Scotia.

References

External links

Film directors from Nova Scotia
Canadian male screenwriters
People from Lunenburg County, Nova Scotia
Living people
Best First Feature Genie and Canadian Screen Award winners
Writers from Nova Scotia
Year of birth missing (living people)
21st-century Canadian screenwriters
21st-century Canadian male writers